Bhale Mogudu Bhale Pellam ( What a Husband! What a Wife!) is a 2011 Telugu-language comedy film, produced by Jonnada Ramana Murthy on Usha Charan Creations banner and directed by Dinesh Babu. Starring Rajendra Prasad, Suhasini, Kaveri Jha and music composed by E. S. Murthy. The film is remake of Kannada film Eradane Maduve (2011).

Cast
 Rajendra Prasad as Venkat
 Suhasini as Madhavi
 Kaveri Jha as Veena
 Naresh
 Raghu Babu
 Harsha Vardhan 
 Jhansi
 Rajitha
 Shilpa

References

External links

Indian comedy-drama films
Telugu remakes of Kannada films
2010s Telugu-language films
2011 comedy-drama films
2011 films
Films directed by Dinesh Baboo